The Southeast Neighborhood Library is a branch of the District of Columbia Public Library in the Capitol Hill neighborhood of Washington, D.C. It is located at 403 7th Street SE.  Designed by architect Edward Lippincott Tilton in the neoclassical style, it opened in 1922 and is one of three Carnegie libraries in Washington.  As of 2019, the city planned a $23.5 million renovation of the library starting in 2021.  The building was listed on the National Register of Historic Places in 2021.

See also
List of Carnegie libraries in Washington, D.C.
National Register of Historic Places listings in Southeast Quadrant, Washington, D.C.

References

External links 

 Official website

Public libraries in Washington, D.C.
Carnegie libraries in Washington, D.C.
National Register of Historic Places in Washington, D.C.